Cryptochloris is a genus of golden moles.

Cryptochloris may also refer to:

Cryptochloris, a grass genus, treated as a synonym of Tetrapogon
Cryptochloris (cryptomonad), a genus in the family Cryptomonadaceae